Alīna Fjodorova (born 18 August 1995) is a Latvian figure skater. She is a three-time Latvian national champion and competed in the free skate at three ISU Championships – 2010 Junior Worlds in The Hague, Netherlands; 2012 Junior Worlds in Minsk, Belarus; and 2012 Europeans in Sheffield, England. In England, she ranked 18th in the short program, 14th in the free skate, and 16th overall. She finished 5th at the 2011 European Youth Olympic Winter Festival.

Programs

Competitive highlights 
JGP: Junior Grand Prix

References

External links

 
 Alīna Fjodorova at Tracings

Latvian female single skaters
1995 births
Living people
Sportspeople from Riga